Nicolas Oreste Flagello (March 15, 1928 – March 16, 1994) was an American composer and conductor of classical music. He was one of the last American composers to develop a distinctive mode of expression based wholly on the principles and techniques of European late romanticism.

Life
Flagello was born in New York City, into a very musical family. His brother Ezio Flagello was a bass who sang at the Metropolitan Opera. One of his first music teachers was the composer Vittorio Giannini, and he then studied at the Manhattan School of Music. Upon graduating (M.M., 1950) he joined the faculty, where he remained for more than 25 years. In 1955, he won a Fulbright Fellowship to study at the Accademia Nazionale di Santa Cecilia in Rome where he worked under Ildebrando Pizzetti.

As a composer, Flagello held firmly to a belief in music as a personal medium for emotional and spiritual expression. This unfashionable view, together with his vehement rejection of the serialism that dominated musical composition for several decades after World War II, hindered his music from attracting significant attention during much of his lifetime. Among his most auspicious successes were the oratorio The Passion of Martin Luther King (1968), premiered in Washington, DC, in 1974, and the opera The Judgment of St. Francis (1959), presented at the Cathedral of St. Francis in Assisi in 1982. He produced a large body of work, including six operas, two symphonies, eight concertos, and numerous orchestral, choral, chamber, and vocal compositions. As a conductor, he made many recordings with the Orchestra Sinfonica di Roma and the Orchestra da Camera di Roma, focusing on repertoire from the Baroque to the 20th century. In the mid-1980s, his career was cut short by a degenerative disease, at which time a number of his works were left without orchestration. Many of these works were later orchestrated by composer and editor Anthony Sbordoni. 

Flagello died in New Rochelle, New York, on March 16, 1994. 

Since his death Flagello's music has generated a greater following, and many of his major works have been recorded. He was married to Dianne Flagello, they have sons, Dr. Donis G. Flagello and Vittorio Flagello.

Selected recordings
Symphony No. 1; Theme, Variations, and Fugue; Sea Cliffs; Piper Intermezzo (Slovak Radio SO, D. Amos, cond) Naxos 8.559148
Cello Capriccio (G. Koutzen, cello); Contemplazioni di Michelangelo (N. Tatum, soprano); Lautrec; Remembrance (M. Randolph, soprano; Orch. Sinf. di Roma, N. Flagello, cond) Phoenix PHCD-125
Piano Sonata; Prelude, Ostinato, and Fugue; Violin Sonata; Declamation; Nocturne et al. (S. Nagata, violin; P. Vinograde, piano) Albany TROY-234
Piano Concertos Nos. 2, 3 (T. Rankovich, piano); Credendum (E. Oliveira, violin); Overture Burlesca; A Goldoni Overture (Slovak Phil, Kosice, D. Amos, cond) Artek AR-0002-2
Piano Concerto No. 1 (T. Rankovich, piano); Dante's Farewell (S. Gonzalez, soprano; National RSO of Ukraine, J. M. Williams, cond); Concerto Sinfonico (New Hudson Sax Qt, Rutgers SO, K. Johns, cond) Naxos 8.559296
Symphony No. 2; Odyssey; Valse Noire; Concerto Sinfonico (U. of Houston Sax Qt, Wind Ensemble, D. Bertman, cond) Naxos 8.573060
Violin Concerto (E. Oliveira, violin); Mirra Interlude and Dance; Symphonic Aria; The Sisters: Interludio; Songs (S. Gonzalez, soprano; National RSO of Ukraine, J. M. Williams, cond) Artek AR-0036-2
Passion of Martin Luther King; The Land; L'Infinito (E. Flagello, bass-baritone; N. Flagello, cond) Naxos 8.112065
Harp Sonata (E. Goodman) BIS CD-319

Principal works

Operas
The Wig (1954); libretto by composer, after Pirandello
Mirra (1955); libretto by composer, after Alfieri
Rip Van Winkle (1957); operetta for children, libretto by Christopher Fiore
The Sisters (1958); libretto by Dean Mundy
The Judgment of St. Francis (1959); libretto by Armand Aulicino 
The Piper of Hamelin (1970); opera for children, libretto by composer, after Browning
Beyond the Horizon (1983); libretto by composer and W. Simmons, after O'Neill

Orchestral works
Beowulf (1949)
Suite for Amber (1951)
Symphonic Aria (1951)
Overture Burlesca (1952)
Interlude and Dance fm. Mirra (1955)
Theme, Variations, and Fugue (1956)
Missa Sinfonica (1957)
Concerto for String Orchestra (1959)
Lautrec Ballet Suite (1965)
A Goldoni Overture (1967)
Symphony No. 1 (1968)
Serenata (1968)
Symphony No. 2 (for winds and percussion; 1970)

Instrumental works with orchestra
Piano Concerto No. 1 (1950)
Concerto Antoniano for Flute and Orchestra (1953)
Piano Concerto No. 2 (1956)
Violin Concerto (1956)
Capriccio for Cello and Orchestra (1962)
Piano Concerto No. 3 (1962)
Credendum for Violin and Orchestra (1973)
Concerto Sinfonico for Saxophone Quartet and Orchestra/Band (1985)

Vocal and choral works with orchestra
The Land (song cycle, Tennyson, bass-baritone and chamber orchestra; 1954)
Tristis est Anima Mea (SATB, orchestra; 1959)
Dante's Farewell (monodrama, soprano and orchestra, text by J. Tusiani; 1962)
Contemplazioni di Michelangelo (soprano and orchestra; 1964)
An Island in the Moon (soprano/tenor and orchestra, Wm. Blake, 1964)
Te Deum for All Mankind (SATB, orchestra; 1967)
Passion of Martin Luther King [oratorio] (bass-baritone, SATB, orchestra; 1968)
Remembrance (soprano, flute, strings/stg. qt., E. Bronte, 1971)
Canto (soprano, orchestra, poem by composer, 1978)

Piano
Etude, Homage to Chopin (1941)
Three Dances (1945)
Symphonic Waltzes (1958)
Prelude, Ostinato, and Fugue (1960)
Piano Sonata (1962)
Concertino for Piano, Brass, and Timpani (1963)

Chamber music
Chorale and Episode for Brass Dectet (1944)
Lyra for Brass Sextet (1945)
Episodes for Woodwind Quintet (1957)
Burlesca for Flute and Guitar (1961)
Sonata for Violin and Piano (1963)
Valse Noire for Saxophone Quartet (1964)
Suite for Harp and String Trio (1965)
Declamation for Violin and Piano (1967)
Philos for Brass Quintet (1969)
Nocturne for Violin and Piano (1969)
Ricercare for 19 Brass and Percussion (1971)

Miscellaneous
Divertimento for Piano and Percussion (1960)
Harp Sonata (1961)
Introduction and Scherzo (1964) for Accordion
Electra (1966) for Piano, Harp, and Percussion
Marionettes (1968) for Harp
Odyssey (1981) for Band
Numerous songs for voice and piano

References

Sources

Odyssey: Birth of a New Work [video documentary, 1981, Educational Audio Visual Inc.] https://www.youtube.com/watch?v=YPYorwNr5lE 
https://www.flagello.com/[composer website]

1928 births
1994 deaths
20th-century classical composers
American male classical composers
American classical composers
Manhattan School of Music alumni
American people of Italian descent
Accademia Nazionale di Santa Cecilia alumni
20th-century American composers
20th-century American male musicians